Eupithecia ultrix is a moth in the family Geometridae. It is found in south-western China (Sichuan, Yunnan).

The wingspan is about 22 mm. The fore- and hindwings are light brown.

References

Moths described in 2004
ultrix
Moths of Asia